Kristján Flóki Finnbogason (born 12 January 1995) is an Icelandic football forward who plays for KR Reykjavík.

Career statistics

Club

International career
Kristján has been involved with the U-19 and U-21 teams, and made his senior team debut against Mexico on 8 February 2017.

International goals

References

External links

1995 births
Living people
Kristjan Floki Finnbogason
Kristjan Floki Finnbogason
Kristjan Floki Finnbogason
Kristjan Floki Finnbogason
Kristjan Floki Finnbogason
IK Start players
IF Brommapojkarna players
Expatriate men's footballers in Denmark
Expatriate footballers in Norway
Kristjan Floki Finnbogason
Kristjan Floki Finnbogason
Kristjan Floki Finnbogason
Eliteserien players
Norwegian First Division players
Danish Superliga players
Allsvenskan players
Association football forwards